"The Way You Make Me Feel" is a song by Irish singer-songwriter Ronan Keating from his debut solo album, Ronan. It was released as the third single from the album on 20 November 2000. The song peaked at number six on the UK Singles Chart. The song was written by English songwriter Phil Thornalley and Canadian singer-songwriter Bryan Adams, who both provide backing vocals on the track. In 2004, the song was re-recorded for Keating's greatest hits album, 10 Years of Hits, featuring vocals from Adams.

Track listings

 UK and Australian CD1
 "The Way You Make Me Feel" (single mix)
 "Song To..."
 "Fairytale of New York" (featuring Máire Brennan)
 "Once Upon a Lifetime"

 UK and Australian CD2
 "The Way You Make Me Feel" (single mix)
 "The Way You Make Me Feel" (Euro mix)
 "In Love, There Is No Pride"
 "Life Is a Rollercoaster" (alternate acoustic version)

 UK cassette single
A. "The Way You Make Me Feel" (single mix)
B. "Song To..."

 European CD single
 "The Way You Make Me Feel" (single mix)
 "The Way You Make Me Feel" (Euro mix)

Credits and personnel
Credits are taken from the Ronan album booklet.

Studios
 Recorded at Swamp Studios
 Mastered at 777 Productions (London, England)

Personnel
 Phil Thornalley – writing, backing vocals, guitars, bass guitar, piano, keyboards, synthesizers, production, mixing
 Bryan Adams – writing, backing vocals
 Dave Munday – guitars, flute
 Chuck Sabo – drums, percussion
 Arun Chakraverty – mastering

Charts

References

2000 singles
2000 songs
Polydor Records singles
Ronan Keating songs
Songs written by Bryan Adams
Songs written by Phil Thornalley